The Red Bird River is one of two tributaries at the head of the South Fork of the Kentucky River, the other being the Goose Creek.
It is located in the Daniel Boone National Forest in extreme southeastern portion of the U.S. state of Kentucky.

Red Bird was the name of a Native American who was murdered near the river.

Course
It rises as Red Bird Creek in northeastern Bell County, then becomes the Red Bird River at the confluence of the Phillips Fork just south of Queendale in Clay County. Continuing north, it forms the boundary between Clay and Leslie counties, eventually coming to a confluence with Goose Creek at Oneida to form the South Fork of the Kentucky River.

Tributaries 
 Big Creek, its own tributaries in that article
 Bear Creek
 Sugar Creek, one location of Marcum post office
 Gilbert Creek, another location of Marcum post office
 Little Double Creek
 Big Double Creek, location of Peabody post office

Localites on the river 
Red Bird River Petroglyphs
Eriline, a post office located at various points

See also
List of rivers of Kentucky

Cross-reference

Sources

External links 
 University of Kentucky: Kentucky River Basin Report
 Daniel Boone National Forest: Red Bird Ranger District
 USGS GNIS Entry

Rivers of Kentucky
Tributaries of the Ohio River
Rivers of Bell County, Kentucky
Rivers of Clay County, Kentucky
Rivers of Leslie County, Kentucky